Adam Gledhill (born 15 February 1993) is a professional rugby league footballer who plays as a  or  for the Batley Bulldogs in the Betfred Championship.

Gledhill has previously been in the systems of the Wakefield Trinity Wildcats in the Super League and played for the Gold Coast Titans reserve-grade side.
Gledhill scored a try for Batley in their 44-12 Million Pound Game loss to Leigh.

References

External links

1993 births
Living people
Batley Bulldogs players
English rugby league players
Rugby league second-rows
Rugby league locks
Rugby league players from Yorkshire
Rugby league props